Persian studies (Persian: مطالعات فارسی) is the study of the Persian language and its literature specifically. It is differentiated from Iranian studies which is a broader, more interdisciplinary subject that focuses more on the histories and cultures of all Iranian peoples.

History of Persian Studies in Iran

Before Islam 

The study of language in Iran reaches back many centuries before Islam. The Avestan alphabet, developed during the Sassanid Empire, was derived from the Pahlavi alphabet and remained one of the most phonologically sophisticated alphabets until the modern period. The Zoroastrian liturgies until that point had been orally transmitted, and the ability to set these ancient texts in writing helped to preserve them. Even earlier than that, however, the invention of the Old Persian syllabary, whose shapes were adapted from preexisting cuneiform systems demonstrates that Iranian peoples could think critically, logically, and imaginatively about their language.

Early Islam 

The coming of Islam announced the end of the world of Antiquity and the replacement of Zoroastrianism with Islam as the most important faith of the Iranian plateau. Iran became part of the great Islamic community, the Ummah, and saw the rise of Arabic as the new language of literature and learning. Iranian-born grammarians, rhetoricians, scientists, philosophers, theologians, contributed to the intellectual vitality of this new and vibrant civilization alongside other Muslims from other nationalities. Among the most prominent are:

 Sibawayh (Arabic: سیبویه Sībawayh) (c. 760 CE) who wrote one of the first grammars of Arabic
 Avicenna (Arabic: أبو علي حسین إبن عبد الله إبن سینا Abū ʿAlī al-Ḥusayn ibn ʿAbd Allāh ibn Sīnā) (c. 980 CE) one of the most celebrated and influential thinkers of the Islamic Golden Age contributed to astronomy, philosophy, logic, and mechanics, and helped to revive the Persian language by coining new words.
 Asadi Tusi (Arabic: أبو منسور علي أحمد اسدي طوسي Abū Mansūr ʿAlī ibn Aḥmad Asadī Ṭūsī) (d. 1072 CE) whose dictionary represented an attempt to standardize the Persian language.

Many regions of this Arab Empire saw the almost total replacement the indigenous language by Arabic: the pre-Islamic languages of Syria, Iraq, Egypt, and North Africa exist only in isolated communities and have been largely replaced by Arabic. Not so in Iran, where the Persian language continued, albeit with an infusion of Arabic vocabulary, and thrived as the courtly language of the Islamic Orient. In fact it was in the Eastern reaches of the Caliphate, far from the seat of Arab power in Baghdad, where New Persian reemerged as a literary and courtly language.

European study of Persian

Early encounters 

Persian was the lingua franca of a wide area, not limited to Iran. The first Europeans to encounter the Persian language were the envoys and diplomats of early modern European nations sent first to Ottoman Turkey and then to other places. The earliest motivation for the study of Persian was to win converts to Christianity.

 Codex Cumanicus, a glossary of Persian and Cuman Turkish words in Latin.
 a translation of the Pentateuch into Persian by the Jew Tavus
 translations from Portuguese of  Francis Xavier's History of Christ and History of Peter (c. 1602 CE)

Study of the living language, 17th century 

Grammars and dictionaries of the Persian language were first composed in the 17th century during which efforts were made to understand the "Persian of the people". Later on, Persian as it was actually used declined in importance as Classical Persian literature was introduced to the continent.

 Raimondo of Cremona seems to have been the first to compose a grammatical sketch of Persian, but his manuscript remaines unavailable.
 the Belgian priest de Dieu published Rudimentae Linguae Persicae (1639 CE) in which he established the basic phonology and morphology of Persian
 Pater Angelus (Joseph Labrosse) studied Persian for fourteen years in the capital of Esfahan as part of the Vatican's Oriental Mission. He published a monumental work composed of "fourteen folios of mini-grammar and over 450 pages of words and phrases of the living language."

Beginnings of Orientalism, 18th century 

During this century, Europeans discovered the rich store of Classical Persian literature, and study of the Persian language meant study of the language as it was used in these works. The first edition of the Gulistan of Sa'di was published in 1654 CE. As British trade with the Indian subcontinent increased, the focus of learning Persian shifted to the "colonial" Persian of India.

 Anquetil published the first edition of the texts of the Zoroastrian Parsis in his three-volume Zend-Avesta (1771 CE).
 William Jones's publication of his grammar (also in 1771 CE) marked when knowledge of Persian grammar became really accessible, since the prior works were not available to most people. He hoped the work would open up study of the Persian Classics, but it was intended to assist East India Company employees. William Jones founded the Asiatic Society of Bengal (1784 CE), the first Oriental society.

Orientalism, rediscovery, 19th century 

During this period of intense interest in the Orient, Persian proved to be one of the most important languages for the incipient field of Comparative Linguistics. Many scholars in prior centuries had commented on the similarities between Germanic and Iranian languages, but in the 19th century, scholars for the first time postulated a common ancestor to languages like Sanskrit, Persian, and European languages which has since come to be called the Proto-Indo-European language.

As important was the deciphering of Old Persian, the language of dozens of inscriptions which still stand in Iran. Sir Henry Rawlinson first discovered that the language of these inscriptions was an ancient form of the Persian language. Since these inscriptions often included inscriptions in other Cuneiform scripts, this decipherment became like a Rosetta Stone for the languages of ancient Mesopotamia. All that we know of the languages and histories of the empires of Babylonia, Assyria, Sumer, Elam, and so on is indirectly indebted to knowledge of the Persian language.

Modernization, 20th century 

During the Qajar dynasty, Iranians first encountered Europeans in the context of the rise of the West. Napoleon's expedition to Egypt in 1798 CE was the first European intrusion into the Muslim Middle East and prefigured many more disruptions for the peoples of this region, especially Iran. Iran lost territory in several wars with Russia and Britain. Iran's economy suffered greatly as European sea lanes bypassed the legendary Silk Road which had always been a pillar of Iran's economy. New industrial processes of production made traditional ways of living impossible for Iranians. As in many other countries during this time like Japan, China, and Turkey, a nationalist reaction occurred in Iran as Iranians realized the importance of modernizing as quickly as possible to fight off the encroachment of the Western powers. It was at this point that modern educational institutions in Western tradition were first opened in Iran. Iran would never be the same, and the study of language there merged with the tradition in Europe.

Persian Studies in the United States 
 Harvard University
 Ohio State University
 San Francisco State University
 University of Maryland
 University of Texas at Austin
University of Michigan at Ann Arbor

References

External links
Library guides:
 

 
Iranian culture
Cultural studies
Middle Eastern studies
Iranian studies
s